

The DINFIA IA 38 was a 1960s Argentine four-engine experimental tailless transport aircraft, designed under the direction of Reimar Horten and based on the German Horten Ho VIII project and built by the DINFIA.

Development
The IA 38 was an experimental cargo aircraft based on research by Reimar Horten. The design was developed to meet a 1950 requirement for an aircraft to carry citrus fruits (and in particular, oranges) from the west of Argentina to Buenos Aires, there being no rail links while the roads were inadequate for heavy trucks. It was an all-metal tailless shoulder-wing swept monoplane, with the vertical control surfaces located near the tips of the wings. The short, stubby fuselage was fitted with a tricycle landing gear, with a retractable nosewheel and fixed mainwheels. Power was provided by four radial engines mounted within the wings, driving pusher propellers mounted clear of the wing trailing edges. The aircraft was designed to use  I.Ae. 19R El Indio, but these were not available and the prototype was forced to use  I.Ae. 16 El Gaucho engines instead. A crew of two were sat in an enclosed cockpit above the leading edge of the wing.

Development work and construction of the prototype was slow, and was further slowed down by the Revolución Libertadora of 1955 that overthrew the government of Juan Perón. While work restarted in 1958, the prototype only made its first flight to 9 December 1960. The IA 38 proved to be difficult to control, and was underpowered, giving a poor performance, while the engines also suffered from overheating. The prototype made three more test flights before the project was cancelled in 1962.

After the project was cancelled, the IA 38 was placed in the grounds of the Aeronautical School, where it was used as a static display until a fire (suspected to have been an act of arson) destroyed the aircraft's skin. The remains of the plane were scrapped afterwards.

Specifications (IA 38 - performance estimated)

See also

Notes

Bibliography
 Green, William & Swanborough, Gordon. "Horten Exotica...to the H IX and beyond." Air Enthusiast, No. 39, May–August 1989, pp. 1–18. .
 Magnusson, Michael. "FMA : from 1945: The story of Fabrica Militar de Aviones, Argentina: Part 8: Horten and other activities in the 1950s." Air-Britain Archive, Autumn 2009. pp. 127–130. .
 Pelletier, Alain J. "Towards the Ideal Aircraft: The Life and Times of the Flying Wing, Part Two". Air Enthusiast, No. 65, September–October 1996, pp. 8–19. .
 The Illustrated Encyclopedia of Aircraft (Part Work 1982-1985), 1985, Orbis Publishing
 Taylor, John W. R. Jane's All The World's Aircraft 1961–62. London: Sampson Low, Marston & Company, 1961.

External links

1960s Argentine experimental aircraft
Tailless aircraft
FMA aircraft
Four-engined pusher aircraft
High-wing aircraft
Aircraft first flown in 1960